Dan Hurley (born November 11, 1957) is an American health and medical journalist and author. He has written several books and contributed pieces to The New York Times, Wired, The Washington Post, Neurology Today and The Atlantic.

Early life
Hurley studied at Beloit College in Wisconsin. He went to Western Carolina University as well.

Honours
Hurley received the American Society of Journalists and Authors' award for investigative journalism in 1995.

Personal life
Hurley was diagnosed with Type 1 diabetes at age 18. He currently resides in New Jersey with his family.

Works
Smarter: The New Science of Building Brain Power New York : Hudson Street Press (2013)  
Diabetes Rising: How a rare disease became a modern pandemic, and what to do about it New York : Kaplan (2011)  
Natural Causes: Death, Lies, and Politics in America's Herbal Supplement Industry New York : Broadway Books (2006)  
The 60-Second Novelist: What 22,613 People Taught Me About Life Deerfield Beach, Fla. : Health Communications (1999)  
''Can You Make Yourself Smarter?: New York Times (2012)

References

External links
 

1957 births
Living people
American male journalists
Journalists from California
Beloit College alumni
People with type 1 diabetes
People from San Diego